This is a list of people associated with the University of Calgary.

Alumni
Alumni are listed by their department of study.

Archeology
Peter Mathews, B.A.: Mayanist, MacArthur Fellow at Yale University
Ronald Wright: award-winning Cambridge University-educated author and historian

Business Administration/Commerce

Classics
Michael Lapidge, B.A.: Medieval scholar, Fellow Emeritus of Clare College, Cambridge University; Fellow of the British Academy, recipient of the Sir Israel Gollancz Prize

Computer Science
Theo de Raadt, B.Sc. 1992: founder and leader of OpenBSD and other projects developed with University of California at Berkeley and DARPA
James Gosling OC, B.Sc. 1977: inventor of the Java programming language
Radford M. Neal, B.Sc., M.Sc.: Research Chair in Statistics and Machine Learning
Xiaolin Wu, B.Ss. Wuhan University, computer engineer, invented programming line algorithm, co-developed neural network facial recognition system (with Xi Zhang), twice featured in MIT's "Technology Review", member of Institute of Electrical and Electronics Engineers

Economics
John Anderson, B.A.: Rhodes Scholar
Stephen Harper, B.A. 1985, M.A. 1991: Prime Minister of Canada
Danielle Smith, B.A.: politician, 19th Premier of Alberta
Chip Wilson B.A.: founder of Lululemon

Engineering

English/Literature/Humanities/Fine Arts

International Relations
Pierre Poilievre, B.A.: Leader of the Conservative Party of Canada and Leader of the Official Opposition, Member of Parliament for Carleton

Kinesiology
Drew Scott, B.Sc.: actor known for his work on Property Brothers
Paweensuda Drouin, B.Sc.: Miss Universe Thailand 2019

Law

Mathematics
Dwight Duffus, Ph.D.: Goodrich C White Professor of Mathematics at Emory University
 Peter Lancaster: Professor of Mathematics, recipient of Humboldt Prize
Douglas Wiens, B.Sc., M.Sc., Ph.D.: recipient of Lester R. Ford Award from Mathematical Association of America, Fellow of American Statistical Association
Ian H. Witten, M.Sc.: B.A. at Cambridge University, inventor of WEKA, Fellow of the Royal Society of New Zealand

Medicine
Jillian Cornish, Ph.D., New Zealand biomedical researcher
William Gnam, M.D.: psychiatrist, Harvard trained health economist, Rhodes Scholar
Sue Pedersen, M.D.: endocrinologist and world expert on obesity
D. George Wyse, M.D.: pharmacologist, internationally recognized expert in cardiac arrhythmia

Natural Sciences

Political Science

Social Sciences

Social Work/Library Studies/Education/ECE
Sir Carlyle Glean, B.Ed, MA: Governor-General of Grenada

Education/ Werklund School of Education/
Jhonattan Bello, MA: Researcher and Educational Leader. Master in Educational Research specialization in Leadership.

Sports

Olympians

Other

Faculty
Faculty are listed by their academic department.

Law
Ian Brodie: former advisor to the Canadian Prime Minister, Strategic Advisor to the Inter-American Development Bank
Anna-Maria Hubert: legal scholar specializing in international marine law and adjudication of science, Research Fellow at Institute for Science, Innovation and Society (InSIS) at the University of Oxford

Classics and Religion
Carolyn Muessig: Chair of Christian Thought; medievalist specializing in sermon literature, female education, and hagiography

English
Susan Bennett, Fellow of the Royal Society of Canada

History
David Bercuson: member of the Calgary School

Sociology
 Ian Brodie: former advisor to Stephen Harper

Political Science
Barry F. Cooper: member of the Calgary School
Tom Flanagan: member of the Calgary School, advisor to Preston Manning and Stephen Harper
Rainer Knopff: member of the Calgary School
Ted Morton: member of the Calgary School, Alberta MLA

Psychology
Philip E. Vernon: Ph.D. Cambridge, D.Sc. London, contributed to I.Q. theory

Physics
Arthur W. Knudsen: researcher on the Manhattan Project; credited by the Physics Department for creating the laboratory system it uses today

Mathematics
Károly Bezdek: Canada Research Chair and Director of the Centre for Computational and Discrete Geometry in the Faculty of Science
Richard K. Guy: combinatorial game theorist, discovered unistable polyhedron with John Horton Conway

Medicine

References

University of Calgary
Calgary
University
University of Calgary